Madiz is a 57 metre twin screw steel yacht built on the River Clyde in Scotland, in 1902. In 2006, she broke a record in the shipping industry by being the only ship in the world to be in class "+100A1" with Lloyd's Register of Shipping, 100 years after the date of its building.

History
Madiz was designed by G. L. Watson, and It is the last surviving ship to have been designed by him personally. She was built by the Ailsa Shipyard in Troon, Scotland on the Clyde.

The yacht was originally named Triton and her first owner was philanthropist James Coats. Following his death, she was purchased in 1913 by Sir George Bullough, owner of the Scottish island of Rùm. He renamed her Rhouma. During World War I, Rhouma was hired for use as an auxiliary patrol yacht. Between the wars, she was lengthened and had an upper deck of cabins added, and her engines were converted to run on oil fuel.

In World War II, she served in the Royal Navy as a Royal Patrol Yacht and transported King George VI, Queen Elizabeth and Queen Elizabeth II. 

Between 2003-2006, Madiz underwent a major refit and was re-classed under Lloyd’s Register of Shipping in her original Class of +100A1. In 2009, the ship was sold.

Construction

Madiz is a classic yacht and retains most of her original deck equipment and unique panelling, the original Burma teak on much of the deck and all the deck’s side panelings. Cuban mahogany in the original master bedrooms and solid oak paneling in the reception areas.

Originally she was powered by two steam engines. These were later replaced by Diesel engines (MTU Mercedes Maybach).

Footnotes

External links
The official Madiz homepage

Individual yachts
Steam yachts
Ships built on the River Clyde
1902 ships